Dolicholagus longirostris, the longsnout blacksmelt, is a species of deep-sea smelt found circumglobally in deep waters of the tropics and subtropics.

References
 

Bathylagidae
Monotypic fish genera
Fish described in 1948